West Carroll may refer to: 

 West Carroll Parish, Louisiana
 West Carroll Township, Cambria County, Pennsylvania

See also 
 Carol (disambiguation)